Euprepiophis is a genus of nonvenomous colubrid snakes, containing three species of Asian rat snakes which were formerly assigned to the genus Elaphe.  They were separated from Elaphe in 2002 by Utiger et al. following evidence from DNA analysis.  They are true rat snakes but are not as closely related to other European, Asian, or North American rat snakes as their former place in Elaphe might suggest.

Species

Euprepiophis conspicillata (H. Boie, 1826) - Japanese forest rat snake
Euprepiophis mandarinus (Cantor, 1842) - Mandarin rat snake
Euprepiophis perlaceus (Stejneger, 1929) - Szechwan rat snake

References

External links

 Utiger's 2002 Rat Snake Phylogeny

Rat snakes
Colubrids
Elaphe conspicillata
Taxa named by Leopold Fitzinger
Snake genera